The 2007 Hel van het Mergelland was the 34th edition of the Volta Limburg Classic cycle race and was held on 7 April 2007. The race started and finished in Eijsden. The race was won by Nico Sijmens.

General classification

References

2007
2007 in road cycling
2007 in Dutch sport